In Greek mythology, Plexaure or Plexaura (Ancient Greek: Πληξαύρη Plêxaurê means 'whipping wind') may refer to:

 Plexaure, one of the 3,000 Oceanids, water-nymph daughters of the Titans Oceanus and his sister-spouse Tethys.
 Plexaure, one of the 50 Nereids, marine-nymph daughters of the 'Old Man of the Sea' Nereus and the Oceanid Doris.

Notes

References 

 Apollodorus, The Library with an English Translation by Sir James George Frazer, F.B.A., F.R.S. in 2 Volumes, Cambridge, MA, Harvard University Press; London, William Heinemann Ltd. 1921. . Online version at the Perseus Digital Library. Greek text available from the same website.
Hesiod, Theogony from The Homeric Hymns and Homerica with an English Translation by Hugh G. Evelyn-White, Cambridge, MA.,Harvard University Press; London, William Heinemann Ltd. 1914. Online version at the Perseus Digital Library. Greek text available from the same website.
Kerényi, Carl, The Gods of the Greeks, Thames and Hudson, London, 1951.

Oceanids
Nereids